The Lebanese liquidity crisis is an ongoing financial crisis affecting Lebanon, that became fully apparent in August 2019, and was further exacerbated by both the COVID-19 pandemic in Lebanon (which began in 2020) and the 2020 Beirut port explosion. The roots of the crisis run deep and the country experienced liquidity shortages in the years prior to 2019 but the full extent of the fragility of the economy were concealed by the financial engineering of the governor of the central bank. Lebanon's crisis was worsened by U.S. sanctions targeting Syria's government and Iran-backed Hezbollah.

Background
Since 1997, the Lebanese pound has been pegged to the U.S. dollar at a rate of £L1,507.5 per US$1. The stability of the pound has been the cornerstone of the Lebanese central bank policy for over two decades. It was meant to bring about much-needed stability to the country after a severe devaluation of the Lebanese pound following the end of the Lebanese Civil War.

Lebanon's post-war economy relied on different sources of foreign currency inflows that were critical to maintain this artificial exchange rate: tourism, real estate, remittances from a diaspora made up of over ten million individuals, a very large financial sector that offered depositors much appreciated anonymity through banking secrecy and high interest rates. These inflows were critical to fund the large trade deficit and the ever growing public debt.

In 2016, Lebanon first witnessed a real slow down in foreign inflows: Between May 2015 and May 2016, the dollar liquidity of the country decreased for the first time in 11 years. As a result, the central bank of Lebanon initiated a series of financial engineering operations which became known in the press as "the swap". The central bank exchanged public debt it owed in Lebanese pounds against Eurobonds, or debt labelled in foreign currency, for the equivalent of US$2 billion. Between June and October 2016, the central bank exchanged these Eurobonds against actual foreign currency with a selection of commercial banks. As a result, the Lebanese economy managed to avoid the consequences of a liquidity crisis at the time, but it increased considerably the public debt in dollars and cost the entire economy a fortune: the International Monetary Fund estimated that the banks that took part in the operation made US$5 billion while the central bank pull-out cost was US$13 billion in foreign currency. If these figures are correct, the banks involved made 40% return on the overall transaction. The central bank repeated similar financial engineering in the following years.

However, even with these operations, Lebanon kept failing to attract sufficient foreign inflows to match the growing demand. As early as late 2018, some commercial banks started to restrict depositors' access to their own funds in foreign currency: they usually imposed an important additional fee on cash withdrawal in US dollars to deter clients from withdrawing dollar cash.

In August 2019, due to various financial hardships, especially the growing probability that the Lebanese government will default on maturing debt obligations, the black market exchange rate started diverging from the official exchange rate.

Following the first large demonstration of the 17 October 2019 protest, Lebanese commercial banks closed for an unprecedented two weeks. When they reopened, commercial banks unlawfully restricted depositors' access to their own money in US dollars – despite no official capital control. These restrictions were one of the key factors that shook the confidence of Lebanese people in their own currency and pushed the value of the Lebanese pound below its official exchange rate.

In the fourth quarter of 2019, the black market exchange rate reached £L1,600 per US$1, and increased to £L3,000 per dollar in April 2020, £L14,000 per dollar in March 2021 and £L15,200 per dollar in June 2021. One bank allowed depositors to withdraw Lebanese pounds from their dollar account at £L2,000 to US$1. This caused significant anger towards the banks, with the prime minister sharply criticizing the governor of the central bank over its performance. The USD black market exchange rate continues to fluctuate substantially due to devaluation of the Lebanese pound caused by acute dollar shortages within Lebanon. This dollar shortage also caused 785 restaurants and cafes to close between September 2019 and February 2020 and resulted in 25,000 employees losing their jobs. Consumer goods prices have increased by 580% since October resulting from the worst economic crisis in decades. The economic crisis made Lebanon's gross domestic product fall to about $44 billion from about $55 billion the year before.

The dollar shortage was further exacerbated by the large amount of Lebanese pounds that the central bank printed from 2019 onward. Data from the Lebanese central bank (BDL) suggest that the money supply M1 grew by 266% from December 2019 to December 2021.

Consequences
 
The fall of the exchange rate caused the 2019–2021 Lebanese protests, which ultimately resulted in the resignation of Prime Minister Saad Hariri and his cabinet. Following this, the COVID-19 pandemic forced additional businesses to close their doors and to lay off their employees.

Prime Minister Hassan Diab stated that the country would default on its Eurobond debt and seek out restructuring agreements amid a spiralling financial crisis that affected foreign currency reserves. Lebanon was due to pay a US$1.2 billion Eurobond on 9 March 2020, with another $700million expected to mature in April and a further $600million in June. Due to the lack of foreign currencies, the prime minister said that the reserves had fallen to "a worrying and dangerous level which pushes the Lebanese government to suspend payment of the 9 March Eurobond maturity because of a need for these funds."

The head of research at Bank Audi stated that Lebanese banks owned $12.7billion of the country's outstanding $30billion Eurobonds as of January 2020. The central bank held $5.7billion and the remainder was owned by foreign creditors.

The debt to GDP ratio sits at 170% as of April 2020. The default is the first one in the history of the country. Foreign currency inflows have slowed and Lebanon's pound has dropped in value compared to the dollar and other currencies. The nation's commercial banks have imposed tough restrictions on dollar withdrawals and transfers to maintain reserves. Due to this Lebanon's sovereign debt became junk rated.

The shortage of US dollars, which are used in everyday transactions in Lebanon, and the crash in the value of the pound have undercut the country's ability to pay for imports, including essentials such as wheat and oil. Banks have stopped giving short-term loans to businesses and no longer provide them with U.S. dollars for imports, forcing people to turn to the black markets. There is also significant inflation, which caused a massive loss of purchasing power and an increase in poverty. The price of foule or ful, a fava bean common in the region, was up 550% in March 2020 over a year earlier. Sugar has seen an increase of 670%, while wheat, tea, rice, and cigarettes have all gone up nearly 1000% over the same period.

This liquidity crisis also created a barrier to everyone with accounts in Lebanese banks, as they are unable to access their deposits. Not only are they unable to access their deposits, but they are unable to withdraw any dollars directly. They can withdraw them in the national currency. These depositors needed to preserve the value of their savings, especially following press reports about restructuring of the banking sector. They therefore turned to buying real estate. For example, revenues from land sales of the major real estate developer, Solidere company, soared from nearly $1.3 million to $234.5 million. Also, these depositors turned to buying shares in Solidere company, which lead to a rise of 500% in it between the start of the liquidity crisis and April 2021. Of seven million Lebanese, about 80% are below the poverty line, while an estimated 100,000 with "fresh money"—funds imported since the 17 October 2019 protests—are wealthy and use downtown Beirut restaurants and stores.

On 1 June 2021, the World Bank released a report which warned that the economic crisis in Lebanon would risk becoming one of the three most severe since the mid-19th century, if its "bankrupt economic system, which benefited a few for so long" weren't reformed. On 11 August 2021, the Central Bank of Lebanon ended fuel subsidies, announcing that they would instead offer "credit lines for fuel imports based on the market price for the Lebanese pound". The decision led to significant increases in fuel prices amid an economic crisis in the country, but the government was unable to alleviate shortages. Days later on 15 August 2021, 33 people were killed in a fuel explosion in the northern Akkar District, exacerbated by the widespread fuel shortages. On 9 October 2021, the country underwent a 24-hour full blackout as the two biggest electricity generators, Zahrani and Deir Ammar, ran out of fuel. Public utilities are only able to offer electricity for a few hours a day because they are unable to buy fuel to power central generators, leading to a massive increase in the number of people buying more expensive power from private generators.

In December 2021, BBC News reported that the economic crisis has caused shortages in the import of vital medicines. Rising unemployment, a depreciating local currency, skyrocketing inflation, and the removal of subsidies for medicines and fuel have made it harder for many people to meet their basic needs. 

In September 2022, Lebanese Association of Banks announced that the banks would close for three days after depositors, who in 2019 overnight found themselves locked out of their bank accounts and unable to access the majority of their own savings, stormed several branches, holding employees hostage and forcibly demanding to withdraw their savings. 

In February 2023, Lebanon devalued its official exchange rate for the first time in 25 years, weakening it by 90% but still leaving the local currency well below its market value due to the ongoing liquidity crisis.

Riad Salameh trials 
In February 2022, a subpoena was issued by Judge Ghada Aoun after Riad Salameh failed to show up to court for questioning, while his whereabouts were unknown after a raid in his office and two homes, as part of an investigation for alleged misconduct and corruption. This sparked controversy with another security agency that was accused of protecting him from trial. Later on 21 March, Salameh along with his brother Raja were charged for illicit enrichment by Ghassan Oueidat, but also failed to attend for questioning. Raja spent a month in detention, but was released on May 22 while on a record bail of LBP100 billion.

On 21 June 2022, Salameh's home was raided again by the Internal Security Forces.

See also

Impossible trinity
List of stock market crashes and bear markets
Currency crisis
Government debt
Economic impact of the COVID-19 pandemic
2021–2022 inflation surge 
Sovereign default
State collapse
2019–present Sri Lankan economic crisis

References

2019 in economics
2020 in economics
2021 in economics
2022 in economics
2023 in economics
2019 in Lebanon
2020 in Lebanon
2021 in Lebanon
2022 in Lebanon
2023 in Lebanon
Economic history of Lebanon
Financial crises